Prasinococcaceae is a family of green algae in the order Prasinococcales.

References

Green algae families
Palmophyllophyceae